Caroline Georgiana Blakiston (born 13 February 1933) is an English actress. She is best known in her native United Kingdom for her role in the television comedy series Brass, to international audiences as Mon Mothma in the Star Wars film Return of the Jedi, and Aunt Agatha in Poldark.

Early life
Blakiston was born in London, the younger daughter of archivist"the most widely known archivist of his generation in England"and author Hugh Noel Blakiston (1905–1984), and (Rachel) Georgiana (1903–1995), daughter of barrister Harold John Hastings Russell (a descendant of the 6th Duke of Bedford) and Lady Victoria Alberta Leveson-Gower, whose father was the statesman Granville Leveson-Gower, 2nd Earl Granville. The Blakiston family originated in County Durham, and were related to the Blakiston baronets.

Blakiston attended RADA.

Career
In the 1960s, Blakiston appeared in three episodes of The Avengers as well a number of ITC productions such as The Saint, Department S and the 1969 Randall and Hopkirk (Deceased) episode "Never Trust a Ghost". She appeared to great acclaim as Marjorie Ferrar in the BBC Television adaptation of Galsworthy's The Forsyte Saga in 1967. In 1977 she appeared in Raffles as Lady Paulton, and also in Murder Most English as Helen Carobleat. In 1980/81, she starred in the BBC/Australian TV World War II comedy series  Private Schulz  as The Countess.

In 1983, Blakiston played the wayward character of Lady Patience Hardacre in the satirical Granada television series Brass, which ran for three series. She portrayed Mon Mothma, the primary political leader of the Rebel Alliance in the 1983 Star Wars film, Return of the Jedi. The 1980s saw Blakiston in a lead role as head of a special unit within British intelligence, opposite Alec McCowen in Mr. Palfrey of Westminster.

In 1986, Blakiston played the villain Bess Sedgwick opposite Joan Hickson's Miss Marple, in the episode "At Bertram's Hotel" of the BBC's Miss Marple series. She also appeared as Lionel Hardcastle's ex-wife in an episode of As Time Goes By. She and Geoffrey Palmer (Lionel) had previously played estranged spouses a decade earlier in Carla Lane's series The Last Song.
From 2015 to 2018, Blakiston played Aunt Agatha in the BBC adaptation Poldark.

Personal life
In 1970, Blakiston married the actor Russell Hunter after they had played together in A Midsummer Night's Dream at the Open Air Theatre, Regent's Park. They had a son and a daughter together, but later divorced.

Filmography

Film

Television

References

External links
 

1933 births
English television actresses
English film actresses
Living people
People from Chelsea, London
Actresses from London
Alumni of RADA
20th-century English actresses
21st-century English actresses